Sidney Sokhona (born 1952) is a Mauritanian filmmaker and politician.

Life
Sokhona shot his first feature film, Nationality: Immigration, from 1972 to 1975 as an immigrant in Paris. The film hybridised documentary and surreal fiction, with Sokhana himself playing the lead role of an immigrant living through a rent strike in the Rue Riquet.

Sokhona wrote on African cinema for Cahiers du Cinéma, arguing that "Africa was colonized, and so is its cinema", and that African film-makers were beginning "to draw up battle plans for [....] cinematic independence".

Filmography
 Nationalité: Immigré [Nationality: Immigration], 1975
 Safrana ou le droit à la parole  [Safrana, or The Right to Speak], 1977

Festivals / Awards

1976 | 5ème FESPACO | Ouagadougou, Burkina Faso | www.fespaco.bf
 Prix spécial du jury (exaequo avec Sejnane, d’Abdellatif Ben Ammar, Tunisie)

1975 | Paris, France
 Prix Georges Sadoul

References

External links
 

1952 births
Living people
Mauritanian film directors
Mauritanian emigrants to France